Leroy Delano "Goldy" Goldsworthy (October 18, 1906 – March 16, 1980) was an American ice hockey forward. He played in the National Hockey League between 1929 and 1939.

Biography
Goldsworthy was born in Two Harbors, Minnesota and raised in Edmonton, Alberta. He moved to Edmonton with his family in 1909 when he was three years old. An excellent baseball and hockey player, he started his National Hockey League career with the New York Rangers in 1929. He also played for the Detroit Red Wings, Chicago Black Hawks, Montreal Canadiens, Boston Bruins, and New York Americans. He retired from the NHL after the 1939 season. He won the Stanley Cup in 1934 with the Chicago Black Hawks.

Goldsworthy died on March 16, 1980.

Jack Leswick tragedy
Goldsworthy along with fellow Black Hawk Rosario Couture were charged with the task of identifying the body of teammate Jack Leswick after his body was pulled from the Assiniboine River in August 1934.

Career statistics

Regular season and playoffs

References

External links

1906 births
1980 deaths
American men's ice hockey right wingers
Canadian ice hockey right wingers
Boston Bruins players
Buffalo Bisons (AHL) players
Chicago Blackhawks players
Cleveland Barons (1937–1973) players
Dallas Texans (AHA) players
Dallas Texans (USHL) players
Detroit Falcons players
Detroit Olympics (IHL) players
Detroit Red Wings players
Eastern Hockey League coaches
Edmonton Eskimos (ice hockey) players
Ice hockey coaches from Minnesota
Ice hockey people from Alberta
London Tecumsehs players
Montreal Canadiens players
New York Americans players
New York Rangers players
People from Two Harbors, Minnesota
Springfield Indians players
Stanley Cup champions
Ice hockey players from Minnesota
American emigrants to Canada